Gadag is a district in the state of Karnataka, India. It was formed in 1997, when it was split from Dharwad district. As of 2011, it had a population of 1064570 (of which 35.21 percent was urban). The overall population increased by 13.14 percent from 1991 to 2001. Gadag district borders Bagalkot district on the north, Koppal district on the east, Vijayanagara district on the southeast, Haveri district on the southwest, Dharwad district on the west and Belgaum District on the northwest. It is famous for the many monuments (primarily Jain and Hindu temples) from the Western Chalukya Empire. It has seven talukas: Gadag, Gajendragad, Ron, Shirhatti, Nargund, Lakshmeshwar and Mundargi.

Historical sites

Gadag
The town has 11th- and 12th-century monuments. The temple of Veera Narayana and the Trikuteshwara complex are sites of religious and historic importance. One of the two main Jain temples is dedicated to Mahavira.
Trikuteshwara temple complex:
The Trikuteshwara temple was built by the early Chalukyas between the sixth and the eighth centuries, exemplifying Chalukya architecture. The temple is dedicated to Saraswati.
Veeranarayana Temple:
The temple, believed to have been built during the 11th century, attracts many devotees.
Lakshmeshwara
Lakshmeshwara is in Shirahatti taluka and is known for its Hindu & Jain temples and mosques. The Someshwara temple complex has a number of temples to Shiva in its fort-like compound.
Sudi
Chalukya monuments include the Jodi Gopura and twin towered Mallikarjuna temple and large Ganesha and Nandi statues.
Lakkundi
About  from Gadag, Lakkundi was the residence of the Chalukyan kings. It is known for its 101 stepwells (known as kalyani or pushkarni) and its Hindu & Jain temples. A sculpture gallery is maintained by the Archaeological Survey of India.
Dambal
Dambal is known for its 12th-century Chalukya Doddabasappa Temple.
Gajendragad
This is the biggest city after Gadag in Gadag district. Gajendragad is known for its hill fort and Kalakaleshwara temple, Nagavi, the famous Yellammadevi temple and a hill-view choultry under construction. It is 55 km from Gadag and is a politically rich village.
Harti
Harti has a number of Hindu temples. The Shri Basaveshwara Temple has an annual festival featuring a procession. Other temples, such as the Parvati Parameshwara temple (Uma Maheshwara Temple), have stone carvings from the Chalukya period.
Kotumachagi
About  from Gadag, the agricultural village is also known for its Someswar and Durgadevi temples. Chamarasa, author of the Prabhulingaleele, was born nearby.
Naregal
Home to the largest Jain temple built by the Rastrakuta dynasty
Hombal
About  from Gadag, the village is known for old temples.
Belavanniki
Belavanniki is about 33 km from Gadag. The village is known for the statue of Veerabhadra which is considered to be best sculpture of its kind in recent times. Earlier, the village was part of Belavalanaadu-300 or Belvola-300 therefore from that its name was derived. It is also the Birthplace of well known social activist S. R. Hiremath.
Ron
Ron's historic monuments include Anantsayee Gudi, Isvara Gudi, Isvara Temple, Kala Gudi, Lokanatha Temple, Mallikarjuna Gudi, Parsvanath Jain temple and the Somlingesvara temple.
Kurtakoti
About  from Gadag, the agricultural village is known for the Shri Ugra Narsimha, Dattatreya, Virupakhshalinga and Rama temples. Statues of Rama, Lakshmana and Sita were installed by Brahma Chaitanya. Writer and critic Kirtinath Kurtakoti hailed from the area.
Nargund
Nargund is an over 1000 year old hilltop fort from the times of the Rashtrakuta dynasty. In 1674, Maratha ruler Chatrapati Shivaji built a citadel here. It is also known for its role in the 1857 revolt when Bhaskar Rao Bhave, the ruler of Nargund revolted against the British, and the 1980s' Peasant movement during Gundu Rao's Chief Ministership of Karnataka and also as the birthplace of senior leader of Jana Sangh Jagannathrao Joshi.
Doni Tanda
About  from Gadag, and known for wind power generation
Beladhadi
About  from Gadag, and known for its Shri Rama Temple and statues of Sri Rama, Lakshmana and Sita
Antur Bentur
About  from Gadag, the agricultural village is known for the Shri Jagadguru Budimahaswamigala Sanstan math Antur Bentur – Hosalli. The matha is cared for by both Muslims and Hindus.

Gadag inscription
 The 'Gadag inscription' of Vikramaditya VI, records that Taila took the head of Panchala by the terror of the pride of his arm in battle.
 The inscription reveals that the battle was fought on the bank of the Godavari & ocean river and a certain Keshava (son of Madhava), fought in the battle and won Taila’s admiration.
 At the command of Sattiga (Satyashraya) in 1006 A.D., a Lenka Keta fell fighting at the battle of Unukallu, probably against the Cholas. An inscription', dated in Saka 930 (1008 A.D.) of the reign of Satyashraya refers to the siege of the agrahara Kaldugu in the Belvola 300 by Desinga and the destruction of the forces because of the treachery of king Perggade.
 The inscription of Ballala recounts his victory as "And by force, he, the strong one, defeated with cavalry only, and deprived of his sovereignty, the general Brahmana whose army was strengthened by an array of elephants and who acquired 60 tusked elephants with a single tuskless elephant, when, on account of an insult, he was tearing the royal fortune from the family of the Kalachuris of Kalyani."

Demographics 
According to the 2011 census the district has a population of 1,064,570. This ranks it 426th in India (out of a total of 640). Its population growth rate from 2001 to 2011 was 9.61 percent. The district has a sex ratio of 978 females for every 1000 males and a literacy rate of 75.18 percent. Scheduled Castes and Scheduled Tribes make up 16.36% and 5.79% of the population respectively.

Hindus are in majority in the district with 85.27% of the population. Muslims are second with 13.50% of the population. There is still a sizeable population of Jains in the district, around 6,000, which are the third largest religion.

Kannada is the main language of the district and is spoken by 85.32% of the population. Urdu is the second-largest language and is spoken by 8.37%, mainly in urban areas. Lambadi is spoken by 3.06% of the population.

Magadi Bird Sanctuary
It is known for migratory species such as the bar-headed goose, which feed on fish and agricultural crops.

Cooperative movement
The first cooperative in India was founded over 100 years ago in Kanaginahal, and K. H. Patil aided in its modernisation.

Wind-power generation
The district generates wind power at Kappatagudda, Binkadakatti, Beladhadi, Mallasanudra, Mulgund and Gajendragad.

Notable people
 Kumara Vyasa – 15th century Kannada poet, known for his epic Karnata Bharata Kathamanjari, was born in Koliwada
 Chamarasa – 15th century Kannada poet, known for his epic Prabhulingaleele
 Panchakshara Gawai
 Bhimsen Joshi – Hindustani singer, was born in Ron
 Puttaraj Gawai
 Sunil Joshi (cricketer)
 Jagannathrao Joshi
 Chennaveera Kanavi
 Aluru Venkata Rao
 Fakkirappa Annappa Mulgund - Freedom Fighter and Noted Gandhian

See also
 Tourism in North Karnataka
 Lakkundi
 Sudi
 Lakshmeshwara
 Gajendragad
 Dambal 
 Doddabasappa Temple
 Naregal, Gadag
 Mahadeva Temple (Itagi)
 Itagi Bhimambika
 Gadag Institute of Medical Sciences

References

External links

 Official website

 
Districts of Karnataka
1997 establishments in Karnataka
Belgaum division

kn:ಗದಗ